KSOP may refer to:

 KSOP-FM, a radio station (104.3 FM) licensed to Salt Lake City, Utah, United States
 KSOP (AM), a radio station (1370 AM) licensed to South Salt Lake, Utah, United States
 Kharkiv School of Photography (KSOP)
 Moore County Airport (North Carolina) (ICAO code KSOP)